L'Été indien (English: Indian summer) is a 2014 television program from Quebec, Canada that was presented by Michel Drucker and Julie Snyder. It was recorded in Old Montreal. It was broadcast in France on France 2, in Quebec on TVA and internationally on TV5Monde.

References

External links
http://tva.canoe.ca/emissions/eteindien
http://www.france2.fr/emissions/ete-indien

TVA (Canadian TV network) original programming
France 2
Television shows filmed in Montreal
2014 Canadian television series debuts
2014 Canadian television series endings
Ici Radio-Canada Télé original programming
TVO original programming
Télé-Québec original programming